USS Lignite (IX-162), a  designated an unclassified miscellaneous vessel, was the only ship of the United States Navy to be named for lignite.  Her keel was laid down on 8 December 1943 by Barrett & Hilp, Belair Shipyard, San Francisco, California, under a Maritime Commission contract (T. B7-D1-Barge). She was launched on 26 February 1944 sponsored by Miss Catherine Barrett, converted for use as a United States Army and United States Marine Corps stores barge by Barrett & Hilp, acquired by the Navy on 26 September 1944, and placed in service at San Francisco the same day.

Service history
Assigned to Service Force, Pacific Fleet, Lignite served as a general stores and issue barge at advance bases in the Philippines and Okinawa. She continued this duty throughout the remainder of World War II.

While serving at Okinawa after the war, the barge was grounded at Buckner Bay on 9 October 1945 by Typhoon Louise, one of the most violent storms ever to strike Okinawa. Lignite, was refloated on 16 October, towed to Hong Kong in March 1946, and towed to Subic Bay, Luzon, in May. She was placed out of service at Subic Bay on 6 August and returned to the War Shipping Administration the following day. Her name was struck from the Naval Vessel Register on 28 August.

Awards
Lignite received one battle star for World War II service.

References

External links
 Photo gallery at navsource.org

 

Trefoil-class concrete barges
Ships built in San Francisco
1944 ships